Padinjarethalakal Cherian Alexander (20 March 1921 – 10 August 2011) was an Indian Administrative Service officer of 1948 batch who served as the Governor of Tamil Nadu from 1988 to 1990 and as the Governor of Maharashtra from 1993 to 2002. He was considered as a candidate for the post of the President of India in 2002. During his time in Maharashtra, he had additional charge of Goa from 1996 to 1998. He was also a member of the Rajya Sabha representing Maharashtra as an independent candidate from 29 July 2002 to 2 April 2008.

His career included extended stints with the United Nations and India's  Ministry of Commerce and his high-profile appointment as the powerful Principal Secretary to the Prime Minister of India during his years with Indira Gandhi. He also served as the Indian High Commissioner to the Court of St. James's.

His autobiography is Through the Corridors of Power. His other works include My years with Indira Gandhi, The Perils of Democracy, and India in the New Millennium.

Family history, early life and background
P.C. Alexander studied at Bishop Hodges Higher Secondary School, and gained his post-graduate degree in History and Economics from the University of Travancore (now University of Kerala). During this period he also remained President, Travancore University Students Union.

Career

Alexander started his career as a civil servant in 1948 and held several high positions. He also involved himself in public life. Alexander was the principal secretary to Indira Gandhi and virtually served as her shadow and policy adviser for the years after her return to power in January 1980. He briefly served Rajiv Gandhi but the latter was not very comfortable with his paternal style and had him replaced. He was sent as India's High Commissioner of India to the United Kingdom (1985-1987). He died in Chennai at the age of 90.

Bibliography
 My Years with Indira Gandhi by P. C. Alexander, Orient Paperbacks,

References

External links 
An interview
An interview
Profile on Government of Maharashtra website

1921 births
2011 deaths
Governors of Goa
Governors of Maharashtra
Governors of Tamil Nadu
Malayali politicians
Rajya Sabha members from Maharashtra
People from Alappuzha district
Annamalai University alumni
High Commissioners of India to the United Kingdom
Indian autobiographers
Deaths from cancer in India
Alexander, P. C.
Indian Oriental Orthodox Christians
Indian Administrative Service officers from Kerala